TakaTuka is  a Java virtual machine (JVM) mainly focused on wireless sensor network devices. The VM focussed on supporting small devices with at least 4 KiB of RAM and greater than 48 KiB of flash memory. TakaTuka currently offers CLDC compatible library support.

TakaTuka was developed by University of Freiburg and first went public on SourceForge in 2009. It was created to reduce the learning time of developing wireless sensor network applications by introducing a common Java language among all supported mote.

TakaTuka stores Java Class files into a highly compact format named Tuk.  This format strips all unnecessary information, such as class names and retains only essential information for runtime. It also shares a similar Split VM architecture with Squawk virtual machine. Furthermore, TakaTuka also employs extensive bytecode compaction that results in smaller code size and faster bytecode execution.

Supported motes 
 Crossbow IRIS
 Crossbow MICA2/MICAz
 Crossbow TelosB
 Sentilla JCreate

See also

List of Java virtual machines
TinyOS

References

External links
Project homepage

Java virtual machine
University of Freiburg